Idhayam ( 'Heart') is a 2009 Indian Tamil-language soap opera on Sun TV. It is a prime-time serial. The show was broadcast from 10 August 2009 to 3 February 2012 at 7:30PM (IST) and 10:00PM (IST) for 627 episodes.

The show is produced by Sathya Jyothi Films, directed by B. Nithyanandam and written by Annakill R.Selvaraj. It was also aired in Sri Lanka Tamil Channel on Shakthi TV.

Plot
Prasad rapes Nandhini in a forest by spraying chloroform out of lust. A few years later she is about to marry Shankar, Prasad's friend, much to Prasad's surprise. He still lusts and wants her as his mistress. But his heart suddenly changes, and he gets an urge to marry her. Nandhini's mother-in-law Kalyani is against his wish and make sure he cannot even touch her shadow. As possessive and chauvinist husband Shankar disowns Nandhini for losing her virginity before their marriage.

Cast

Main cast
 Nithya Das as Nandini Shankar
 Seetha as Dr. Kalyani Devarajan (died in the serial)
 Sanjeev as Valmiki
 Shreekumar as Shankar Devarajan

Recurring cast
 Nalini as Mangalam 
 Ravikumar as Gangadharan
 Sathyapriya as Padma
 Chitra Lakshmanan as Devarajan
 T. P. Gajendran 
 Shari
 Rajashree / Varsha
 Devadarshini as Jeya
 Neelima Rani as Sumathi
 Shyam Ganesh 
 Yugendran
 Sai Prashanth as Prasad
 Vijay Sarathy as Ganesh
 Ramesh
 Sudha
 Vasanth
 Rajini Nivetha
 K.Manokhar
 Bharthy

Remake

The series was remade in Hindi as Dil Se Diya Vachan which aired on Zee TV in 2010-2011. The remake starred Vandana Joshi as Nandini Rajadhyaksha (Nandini), Gaurav Khanna as Prem Rajadhyaksha (Piream) and Neena Gupta as Dr. Kalyani Rajadhyaksha (Dr.Kalyani).

Awards and nominations

See also
 List of programs broadcast by Sun TV
 List of TV shows aired on Sun TV (India)

References

External links
 Vision Time on YouTube
 Official Website 
 Sun TV on YouTube
 Sun TV Network 
 Sun Group 

Sun TV original programming
Tamil-language medical television series
2000s Tamil-language television series
2009 Tamil-language television series debuts
2012 Tamil-language television series endings
Tamil-language television shows